Kingston Grammar School is an independent co-educational day school in Kingston upon Thames, England. The school was founded by royal charter in 1561 but can trace its roots back to at least the 13th century. It is a registered charity under English law. It was a boys' school from its foundation until 1978, when the first girls were admitted.

In 2018 the GCSE results recorded 85% of grades were A*/A or 9–7, and at A-level 62.7% of all grades were A or A*. In 2008 the Good Schools Guide described the school as "An academic school with a modern edge".

History

The school's history is traceable into the Middle Ages, where there are references to schoolmasters like Gilbert de Southwell in 1272, described as "Rector of the Schools in Kingston", and to Hugh de Kyngeston in 1364 "who presides over the Public School there". Notable in the school's history are the founding and endowing of the Lovekyn Chapel by John and then Edward Lovekyn in 1309-1352 and later by William Walworth in 1371. The chapel is still used by the school.

After the dissolution of the chantries in 1547, the chapel fell to the Crown and was deconsecrated. It, and by now its substantial related endowments, fell to a court favourite, Richard Taverner. He preserved the chapel so when in 1561 the bailiffs of Kingston petitioned Queen Elizabeth I for a royal grammar school, the building was still usable. The Queen granted the school a royal charter in 1561.

The school became a direct grant grammar school in 1946 as a result of the Education Act 1944 and became independent in 1978 after the scheme was abolished by the 1974–79 Labour Government. In the same year, the first girls were admitted.

KGS celebrated the four hundredth anniversary of its founding charter in 1961 with a visit from Queen Elizabeth II. In 2005 she opened the new Queen Elizabeth II Building, where she unveiled a plaque, met with students of Music and Geography and watched an excerpt of the play "Smike" after which the new Recording Studio was named.

On 1 May 1965 the school opened its new playing fields at Thames Ditton, alongside which was built its boathouse, donated by R.C Sherriff. Prior to this it had shared Kingston Rowing Club's boathouse, and had owned much smaller playing fields at Ditton Road, Kingston.

Houses
There are five houses, named after Medieval and Elizabethan figures connected with the school and the city of London, with the exception of Stanley Shoveller, an Old Kingstonian who played international hockey in the early 20th century.

Extracurricular activities
The school has a sporting programme, with the main sports being football, netball, tennis, hockey, rowing and cricket.

Hockey, rowing and cricket are the school's performance sports with hockey and rowing having  achieved successes at national level, including three national hockey titles in 2019.

The 'R.C. Sherriff' rowing boathouse is on the Thames at Thames Ditton, Surrey. Students may take up rowing beginning in Third Form (Year 9) and participate in local and national regattas, including The National Schools Regatta and Henley Royal Regatta.

The school has produced professional and international athletes, most commonly in hockey and rowing but also more recently in football and cricket.

Notable former pupils

 Alexander McLean — activist, humanitarian, and lawyer, founder of Justice Defenders which seeks to improve the lives of people imprisoned in Africa.
 Christopher Bryan — international football player, Turks and Caicos
 Paul Butler (bishop) — Bishop of Durham
 William Gilbert Chaloner  — paleobiologist, Royal Holloway
 Richard Cheetham — Bishop of Kingston upon Thames
 James Cracknell — Olympic rowing gold medallist, adventurer
 Philip Crosland — journalist
 Richard Dodds — International hockey player: Captain of the Great Britain Olympic 1988 gold medal hockey team
 Ian Dyson — Commissioner of the City of London Police
 Michael Edwards — poet & academic, first Briton elected to the Académie Française
 Brett Garrard — international hockey player
 Sarah Evans — international hockey player
 Neil Fox — DJ and television presenter
 Michael Frayn — playwright and novelist
 Edward Gibbon — author, The History of the Decline and Fall of the Roman Empire
 Air Marshal Sir Gerald Gibbs — RAF officer
 Tanya Gold — The Guardian journalist
 Sophie Hosking — Olympic rowing gold medallist
 Jonathan Kenworthy — sculptor
 Francis Maseres — lawyer, mathematician, Attorney-General of Quebec
 Leif Mills — author and former trade unionist
 Neil Mullarkey — actor, writer and comedian
 Jonathon Riley — Director General and Master of the Armouries
 R. C. Sherriff — playwright, who donated five rowing eights (named after his plays: "Journey's End", "White Carnation", "Home at Seven", "Long Sunset" and "Badger's Green") to the school boat club in the 1960s and 1970s
 John Spiers (entrepreneur) — entrepreneur 
 Sir Denis Spotswood — Chief of the Air Staff, 1971-1974
 Howard Stoate — formerly MP for Dartford
 Andy Sturgeon — garden designer, journalist and broadcaster
 Zachary Wallace — international hockey player

References

Sources
Ward, The Rev David; Evans, Gordon W. (2000). Chantry Chapel to Royal Grammar School: the History of Kingston Grammar School 1299–1999. Gresham Books.

External links

Profile on the Independent Schools Council website
BBC school report

1561 establishments in England
Educational institutions established in the 1560s
Private co-educational schools in London
Private schools in the Royal Borough of Kingston upon Thames
Member schools of the Headmasters' and Headmistresses' Conference
Schools with a royal charter